Joseph Holt (1807–1894) was a United States lawyer and politician.

Joseph Holt may also refer to:

Joseph Holt (rebel) (1756–1826), United Irish General rebel transported to Australia
Joseph Holt (cricketer) (1885–1968), Jamaica and West Indies cricketer
Joseph F. Holt (1924–1997), U.S. Representative from California
Joseph Holt's Brewery of Manchester, England

Holt, Joseph